W. Stephen Wilson is a mathematician based in Johns Hopkins University specializing in homotopy theory.

Wilson received his Ph.D. from Massachusetts Institute of Technology in 1972 under the supervision of Franklin Paul Peterson.

In 2012, Wilson became a fellow of the American Mathematical Society.

References

Living people
Year of birth missing (living people)
Fellows of the American Mathematical Society
Johns Hopkins University faculty
21st-century American mathematicians
Massachusetts Institute of Technology School of Science alumni
Topologists